Gradac is a village in the municipality of Ivanjica, Serbia. According to the 2011 census, the village has a population of 73 inhabitants. The village is home to the Cross of Gradac, a large stone cross erected in 1662 that served as a village record.

References

Populated places in Moravica District